Lafourche Parish is a parish located in the south of the U.S. state of Louisiana. The parish seat is Thibodaux. The parish was formed in 1807. It was originally the northern part of Lafourche Interior Parish, which consisted of the present parishes of Lafourche and Terrebonne. Lafourche Parish was named after the Bayou Lafourche. City buildings have been featured in television and movies, such as in Fletch Lives, due to its architecture and rich history. At the 2020 census, its population was 97,557.

Long a center of sugar cane plantations and sugar production, in November 1887 the parish was the site of the Thibodaux Massacre. After state militia were used to suppress a massive Knights of Labor strike involving 10,000 workers in four parishes, many African Americans retreated to Thibodaux. Local paramilitary forces attacked the men and their families, killing an estimated 50 persons. Hundreds more were missing, wounded, and presumed dead in one of the deadliest incidents of labor suppression and racial terrorism.

Lafourche Parish is part of the Houma-Thibodaux metropolitan statistical area. People of the state-recognized Native American Houma Tribe live in both Lafourche and Terrebonne parishes.

History
South Louisiana became known as Sugarland, and Lafourche one of the sugar parishes, where sugar cane plantations were established before and after the Civil War. They required the labor of large numbers of enslaved African Americans. In the postbellum era, they comprised from 50 to 80 percent of the population in most of the sugar parishes.

Particularly after Reconstruction, whites in the parish used violence and intimidation against the large population of freedmen to suppress Republican voting and re-establish white supremacy, but were less successful than in North Louisiana until after disenfranchisement of blacks at the turn of the century. From 1877 through the early 20th century, there were 52 lynchings of African Americans in Lafourche Parish. Most of the deaths were due to white suppression of labor unrest in 1887; blacks were skilled sugar workers and had begun to organize for better wages and conditions. Some 10,000 workers had struck in Lafourche and three other parishes during the critical harvest period. At the request of the planters, the state sent in militia against the workers to break the strike.

In what was called the Thibodaux Massacre of November 22, 1887, local whites organized by leaders of the town killed up to 50 blacks who had taken refuge in the African-American quarters after a major Knights of Labor strike was called on sugar plantations.  Hundreds more were wounded or missing, and presumed dead.

The total deaths in this parish due to this racial terrorism were the highest of any parish in the state and nearly twice as high as some others among the six parishes with the highest totals. In general, most of the lynching and racial terrorism took place in the late 19th and early 20th centuries.

On August 29, 2021, Hurricane Ida made landfall in Port Fourchon at 16:55 UTC as a category 4 hurricane with maximum sustained winds of 150 mph. Additional reports surveyed by ships in Port Fourchon reported wind gusts up to 194 knots. In Golden Meadow, LA, the National Weather Service recorded storm surge measurements of 10.1 ft.  It was the strongest storm on record to make landfall in Lafourche Parish and at the time the 5th costliest hurricane in United States history.

Geography
To the south of the parish is the Gulf of Mexico.

Major highways
  Interstate 49 
  U.S. Highway 90
  Louisiana Highway 1
  Louisiana Highway 20
  Louisiana Highway 24
  Louisiana Highway 304
  Louisiana Highway 308

Adjacent parishes
 St. James Parish (north)
 St. John the Baptist Parish  (north)
 St. Charles Parish  (northeast)
 Jefferson Parish  (east)
 Terrebonne Parish  (west)
 Assumption Parish  (northwest)

National protected area
 Jean Lafitte National Historical Park and Preserve (part, in Thibodaux)

Communities

City 
 Thibodaux (parish seat)

Towns 
 Golden Meadow
 Lockport

Census-designated places 

 Bayou Blue
 Bayou Country Club
 Chackbay
 Choctaw
 Cut Off
 Des Allemands
 Galliano
 Kraemer
 Lafourche Crossing
 Larose
 Lockport Heights
 Mathews
 Port Fourchon
 Raceland

Other areas 
 Gheens
 Leeville

Demographics

As of the 2020 United States census, there were 97,557 people, 36,759 households, and 25,224 families residing in the parish. The average household size was 2.60 and the average family size was 3.04.

In 2000, there were 89,794 people living in the parish. The racial makeup of Lafourche was 82.85% White, 12.61% Black or African American, 2.30% American Indian and Alaska Native, 0.67% Asian, 0.02% Pacific Islander, 0.58% from other races, and 0.97% from two or more races; 1.43% of the population were Hispanic or Latino American of any race. Among the population, 19.12% reported speaking French or Cajun French at home, while 1.51% spoke Spanish.

Up from $34,910 in 2000, the median income of a household in the parish was $51,339 according to the 2019 American Community Survey. In 2000, males had a median income of $34,600 versus $19,484 for females. The per capita income for the parish was $15,809. About 13.20% of families and 16.50% of the population were below the poverty line, including 21.90% of those under age 18 and 18.30% of those age 65 or over.

Education
The parish is zoned to Lafourche Parish Public Schools.

Residents of select portions of Lafourche Parish (particularly in parts of Grand Bois and Bourg) may attend schools in the Terrebonne Parish School District.

High schools
 Central Lafourche in Mathews
 South Lafourche in Galliano
 Thibodaux High in Thibodaux
 Edward Douglas White Catholic High School in Thibodaux

Colleges and universities
 Nicholls State University in Thibodaux

The parish is in the service area of Fletcher Technical Community College.

National Guard
D Company 2-156 Infantry Battalion of the 256TH Infantry Brigade Combat Team resides in Thibodaux, Louisiana

Notable people
 Mattie Breaux, cast member of Party Down South
 Jefferson J. DeBlanc (1921-2007), United States Marine Corps fighter pilot and flying ace; received the Medal of Honor for actions during World War II
 Dick Guidry (1929-2014), member of Louisiana House of Representatives from 1950–54 and 1964-76. Considered the youngest person ever elected to the Louisiana House. 
 Bobby Hebert, former NFL quarterback
 Harvey Peltier, Jr.
 Harvey Peltier, Sr.
 Glen Pitre
 Loulan Pitre, Jr.
 Ed Orgeron, head football coach at LSU, Ole Miss, USC; NFL assistant coach

Politics

See also
 National Register of Historic Places listings in Lafourche Parish, Louisiana
 Louisiana Highway 1 Bridge

References

External links
 Lafourche Parish
 Lafourche Parish Public Library
 VisitLafourche.com - Tourist commission site
 DigInLafourche.com - Events and Attractions

 
Acadiana
Parishes in Acadiana
Louisiana parishes
Houma – Thibodaux metropolitan area
1807 establishments in the Territory of Orleans
Populated places established in 1807